National Collector's Mint, Inc. is a Westchester County  New York based company that sells privately produced coins, tokens, commemoratives, and collectibles, as well as anti-aging skin products through the BioLogic brand. The company does not produce coins that are legal tender in the United States and is not affiliated, endorsed, or licensed by the U.S. government or the United States Mint. However, the company does also act as a retailer, reselling government proof coins and other legal tender. The mint also creates non-currency coins for large corporations. After National Collector's Mint was repeatedly cited by state and Federal authorities for fraudulent profiteering from the 9/11 attacks, The Huffington Post described the company as a "bogus 9/11 coin seller."

Legal tender status
As specified by the U.S. Constitution only the federal government can produce legal tender coinage for use within the states and territories. (The right to print legal tender banknotes was affirmed later.) Therefore, the medals, tokens, and other products produced by National Collector's Mint are not legal tender in the United States or its territories.

September 11, 2001 Coinage Incident
The company's repeated attempts to profit from the 9/11 attacks led Senator Charles Schumer to refer to the company as a "despicable scam." The company was penalized for fraud in 2004, when State Supreme Court Justice Thomas J. McNamara fined the National Collector's Mint for engaging in false advertising and deceptive business practices when issuing their Freedom Tower Silver Dollar coins.

Sales of the Freedom Tower Silver Dollar coins were halted by a court order in October 2004 at the request of then New York Attorney General Eliot Spitzer. The company received approval from the officials of the Commonwealth of the Northern Mariana Islands to produce legal tender coinage on their behalf, but Spitzer noted the Commonwealth is not authorized to issue its own currency. It was also indicated that the exact amount of silver contained in the commemorative was not clear to customers. A judge ruled in 2004 the company was guilty of fraud, false advertising and deceptive business. Subsequent ads for the new Freedom Tower coins indicated the actual silver weight (45 mg, or 0.00145 troy oz.) rather than the thickness of silver in mils used.

Senator Charles Schumer and Representative Jerrold Nadler said the claim the silver was recovered from the vaults beneath the World Trade Center ruins cannot be substantiated and called on the Federal Trade Commission to stop National Collector's Mint from selling the Sept. 11 coins, which are seen as taking sales away from an official Sept. 11 medal that benefits the National September 11 Memorial & Museum being built at the World Trade Center site.

In contrast to the NCM's unsubstantiated claims, a sizeable number of coins that can be traced back to the WTC vaults exist; unlike the NCM's offerings, these coins were certified and graded by PCGS, and profits from their sales were donated to recovery funds.

In 2013, the company settled out of court and agreed to pay a $750,000 fine to the FTC for misrepresenting the authenticity of their 9/11 products.

2020 $50 Gold Buffalo Tribute Proof

In 2020, the company advertised a coin coated with 14 milligrams of 24 karat gold. Based on recent prices in early April, 2020, this amount of gold was worth approximately 70 cents.  The coin was offered for $9.95 plus $4.95 shipping and handling.

See also
 Danbury Mint
 Franklin Mint
 Littleton Coin Company

References

External links
 National Collector's Mint

Manufacturing companies based in New York (state)
Coin retailers
Port Chester, New York
Companies based in Westchester County, New York